Georges Heights is an urban locality in the suburb of Mosman, adjoining Sydney, in the state of New South Wales, Australia. Georges Heights is located in the local government area of the Municipality of Mosman and is part of the Lower North Shore.

History

Georges Heights was named after King George III, who reigned from 1760 to 1820, which was during the time that the First Fleet left Portsmouth, England in 1788 and arrived in what is now Sydney Harbour.

The Georges Head Battery located in Georges Heights was constructed in 1871. A naval depot stands on the eastern side of Chowder Bay.

Heritage listings
Georges Heights has a number of heritage-listed sites, including:
 Chowder Bay Road: Georges Head Military Fortifications

References

Sydney localities
Mosman Council